Robert Allen was an Irish politician.

Allen was educated at Trinity College, Dublin. From 1713 to 1714, he was MP for Carysfort in County Wicklow.

References

Alumni of Trinity College Dublin
Irish MPs 1713–1714
Members of the Parliament of Ireland (pre-1801) for County Wicklow constituencies